Yuxarı Cibikli (also, Yukhary-Dzhibikli) is a village in the Qubadli Rayon of Azerbaijan.

References 

Populated places in Qubadli District